Oldthort or Oultort is a townland near Portumna, County Galway, Ireland, mainly along the Tynagh Road.

Further reading
Lickmolassy by the Shannon: A History of Gortanumera and Surrounding Parishes by John Joe Conwell (1998)

References

Townlands of County Galway